Pebane George Moteka is a South African politician who was elected to the National Assembly at the 2014 general election as a representative of the Economic Freedom Fighters (EFF). He was re-elected to parliament in 2019. He resigned from parliament on 31 July 2022.

Moteka is a member of the Central Command Team of the EFF, the party's highest decision-making structure.

References

External links

Living people
Year of birth missing (living people)
Place of birth missing (living people)
People from Gauteng
Economic Freedom Fighters politicians
Members of the National Assembly of South Africa
21st-century South African politicians